Jens Söring, usually rendered in English as Jens Soering, (born 1 August 1966, in Bangkok, Thailand) is a German who, in 1990, was convicted in Virginia, United States of America of murdering the parents of his then-girlfriend, Elizabeth Haysom. For her role in the deaths, Haysom was convicted of two counts of accessory before the fact to murder.

The killings took place at the Haysom's residence in the unincorporated hamlet of Boonsboro, Bedford County, Virginia in March 1985. Söring (along with Elizabeth Haysom) fled the United States shortly after. They were arrested in London in April 1986.  His fight against extradition led to the landmark judgment of the European Court of Human Rights in Soering v United Kingdom that establishes that extradition to the United States is illegal if the accused faces the death penalty. Söring was extradited after the authorities in Bedford County gave assurances that they would not seek the death penalty.

Following his arrest in 1986, Söring confessed to the murders during interrogation by police but at his trial in 1990 he pleaded not guilty, claiming he confessed to shield Haysom from prosecution, believing that he had diplomatic immunity.  Söring was convicted and sentenced to two consecutive life sentences. Alleging irregularities in the investigation leading to his arrest and in his trial, in the years following his conviction Söring filed a number of legal appeals and post-conviction petitions.  All were rejected by the courts.  Prior to being granted parole in November 2019, fourteen parole requests were denied and numerous petitions for a gubernatorial pardon were unsuccessful. His parole was granted in November 2019, with Söring being deported back to Germany and barred from entering the United States.

During his incarceration, Söring converted from Buddhism to Roman Catholicism and wrote multiple books about his life in prison and his religious beliefs. His 2007 book The Convict Christ was awarded first prize by the Catholic Press Association of North America in the category "Social Concerns".

Early life and education
Jens Söring was born on 1 August 1966, in Bangkok as the son of a German diplomat, Klaus Söring. He moved to the United States in 1977 and graduated from The Lovett School in Atlanta, Georgia, in 1984. He then attended the University of Virginia where he entered into a relationship with fellow student Elizabeth Haysom.

Crimes, confessions and extradition
In March 1985, when Söring was 18 and Haysom was 20, Haysom's parents, Derek (born 1913) and Nancy Haysom (born 1931), were murdered in their home in the then unincorporated hamlet of Boonsboro, in Bedford County, Virginia. Six months after the murders, with investigators closing in on the couple, Söring and Haysom fled to England where they lived under assumed names.

On 30 April 1986, Söring and Haysom were arrested for fraud after writing over $5,000 ($ today) in fake checks, using false papers, and lying to the police in London, England. Under questioning by British, American, West German and Virginia authorities, Söring confessed to the double murder several times to several authorities, including medical persons.

Haysom waived extradition. Söring fought extradition on the basis that the capital punishment and especially the exposure to the so-called death row phenomenon, i.e. the emotional distress felt by prisoners on death row constitute inhuman or degrading treatment as forbidden by Article 3 of the European Convention on Human Rights. On 7 July 1989, the European Court of Human Rights agreed with this assessment and ruled in Soering v United Kingdom that extradition to countries where the accused faces the death row phenomenon is unlawful. After this decision, the authorities in Bedford County agreed not to pursue the death penalty, and Söring was extradited to the United States on 12 January 1990.

Trial and conviction
Haysom pleaded guilty and then testified against Söring. At trial, she testified that Söring committed the murders and that she was an accessory to the crime.

Söring was tried for two counts of first degree murder in 1990. According to the prosecution, he committed the murders and Haysom was an accessory before the fact. Söring pleaded not guilty, stating he made a false confession to protect Haysom, as he assumed he would have diplomatic immunity.

Söring was sentenced to two consecutive life terms. Haysom was sentenced to 90 years imprisonment (one 45-year sentence for each murder, to be served consecutively). She had a mandatory release date in 2032 when she would have been 68 years old, but was released concurrently with Söring and deported to Canada in December 2019.

Alleged irregularities 
Since the trial, Söring has raised several issues regarding his trial: Richard Neaton, Söring's defense attorney, was subsequently disciplined and eventually disbarred for reasons unrelated to Söring's case, and admitted to having had a drug problem while representing Söring; moreover, the judge, William M. Sweeney, knew Nancy Haysom's brother (Elizabeth's uncle) and had presided over Elizabeth's court proceeding. Ed Sulzbach, an FBI profiler who according to some familiar with the case was asked to consult, concluded that the crime had been committed by a female who knew the Haysoms, settling on Elizabeth as the likely killer. The detective working on the case, Ricky Gardner, denied that a profile had been created by Sulzbach. No report was entered into evidence at Söring's trial.

A blood-smeared sock print was introduced as main evidence against Söring. The prosecution's expert witness, Robert Hallett, who was not an expert on footprints, claimed that he was able to match it perfectly to Söring. An FBI agent interviewed by WVTF in 2018 dismissed the witnesses' methods as a "magic trick" and noted that Sulzbach had matched the sock to a female in his report.

In 2009, the 42 pieces of DNA evidence from the crime scene were tested (technology was previously not sufficiently advanced). Of the 42, 31 were either too small or degraded to yield results.  The 11 samples successfully tested excluded both Söring and Elizabeth Haysom.

Further investigations and parole requests
Jens Söring began to be eligible for parole in 2003. His twelfth parole request was denied at the beginning of 2017. A petition for an absolute pardon was filed on 22 August 2016.

Chuck Reid, one of the original investigators of the Haysom murders, has occasionally agreed to be interviewed about the case. His participation in the 2016 documentary The Promise led him to take his long-standing doubts about the outcome more seriously.

On 3 May 2017, Albemarle County Sheriff J. E. "Chip" Harding released a 19-page report on a months-long investigation he had conducted on this case. He concluded that Jens Söring is innocent and asked Governor McAuliffe to pardon him. On 27 September 2017, Harding held a press conference and advocated for Söring's release together with another investigator, Richard L. Hudson Jr. They also presented expert testimony of three forensic scientists who agreed that Söring's DNA did not match the blood found on the crime scene.
  
On 10 October 2017, Germany's ambassador Peter Wittig and its former president Christian Wulff, amongst Söring's Counsel Steven Rosenfield and others, attended Söring's 13th parole hearing. Following this hearing, Wittig told the assembled media "We are deeply convinced of the innocence of Jens Söring."

On 27 October 2017, a further press conference was held by Gail Starling Marshall, former Deputy Attorney General of Virginia, where Söring's counsel, Steven Rosenfield, announced that the University of Richmond School of Law's Institute for Actual Innocence supports Söring's pardon petition based on the DNA evidence excluding Söring.

On 25 November 2019, Governor Ralph Northam accepted the Virginia Parole Board's recommendation to release both Haysom and Söring. Though neither will receive a gubernatorial pardon, both were released into the custody of US Immigration and Customs Enforcement (ICE) for deportation to their home countries of Canada and Germany. Both remain ineligible to reenter the United States.

On 17 December 2019, Söring returned to Germany by landing in Frankfurt.

Life in prison and writings
Söring served his sentence at the Buckingham Correctional Center in Dillwyn, Virginia. While in prison, he converted from Buddhism to Roman Catholicism. Söring has published several books and articles while incarcerated. In 1995, he wrote Mortal Thoughts, describing it as "The autobiography of a young man imprisoned for a double-murder he did not commit." In 2007, his book The Convict Christ was awarded first prize by the Catholic Press Association of North America in the category, "Social Concerns."
Mortal Thoughts. 1995

 (Written by Jens Söring and Bill Sizemore, with a foreword by Martin Sheen)

Documentary

A full-length documentary film about the case, Killing for Love (German: Das Versprechen or The Promise), by Marcus Vetter and Karin Steinberger, premiered at the Munich International Film Festival and was released theatrically in October 2016. It had its North American premiere on 5 November 2016, at the Virginia Film Festival. In the U.K. the film was expanded into a six-part series shown in March 2017 on BBC Four as part of the documentary strand Storyville. In the Netherlands, public broadcaster NPO2 showed the film in two parts in its documentary series 2Doc in April 2017.

A podcast inspired by the documentary Killing for Love (in German, Das Versprechen) was reproduced and publicized in the United States by AMC Theatres, in collaboration with Amanda Knox's true crime podcast, The Truth About True Crime. Another podcast based on his case was published by Jason Flom and novelist John Grisham, Did a Fatal Attraction Lead to a Wrongful Conviction? The Story of Jens Soering. In 2022, an eight-part German podcast series called "Das System Söring" ("The Söring System") was released by German journalists Alice Brauner and Johanna Behre, which critically assessed different aspects of Söring's life, including his supporters, his testimony, and media coverage around his person.

References

External links

1966 births
Living people
20th-century German criminals
German people imprisoned abroad
German autobiographers
German Roman Catholics
German non-fiction writers
Prison reformers
German bloggers
University of Virginia alumni
1985 murders in the United States
German people convicted of murder
Prisoners sentenced to life imprisonment by Virginia
People convicted of murder by Virginia
Murder in Virginia
German male non-fiction writers
People extradited from the United Kingdom to the United States
German prisoners sentenced to life imprisonment
People paroled from life sentence
Converts to Roman Catholicism from Buddhism
Male bloggers
20th-century non-fiction writers